Jaya is a genus of antlions (Myrmeleontidae) with 5 species occurring in Africa and Eurasia.

Species 
 Jaya atrata (Fabricius, 1781)
 Jaya waterloti (Navás, 1914)
 Jaya dasymalla (Gerstaecker, 1863)
 Jaya rogeri Navás, 1912
 Jaya stephaniae Insom & Terzani, 2014

References

Myrmeleontidae genera
Acanthaclisini